Maja Reichard (born 27 May 1991) is a Swedish swimmer. She has a visual impairment caused by retinitis pigmentosa and competes in the S11 disability class. She's the reigning paralympic champion in 100 m breaststroke.

Reichard won a gold medal at the 2010 IPC Swimming World Championships in the 100 m breaststroke. She entered four events at the 2012 Paralympics and came first in the 100 m breaststroke. She gained four medals, including one gold, at the 2013 World Championships and a further four at the 2014 European Championships. She also won a bronze in 100 m backstroke at the 2016 Summer Paralympics in Rio de Janeiro.

References 

1991 births
Living people
Swedish female backstroke swimmers
Swedish female breaststroke swimmers
Swedish female freestyle swimmers
Swedish female butterfly swimmers
Swedish female medley swimmers
S11-classified Paralympic swimmers
Paralympic swimmers with a vision impairment
Paralympic swimmers of Sweden
Paralympic gold medalists for Sweden
Paralympic silver medalists for Sweden
Paralympic bronze medalists for Sweden
Paralympic medalists in swimming
Swimmers at the 2012 Summer Paralympics
Swimmers at the 2016 Summer Paralympics
Medalists at the 2012 Summer Paralympics
Medalists at the 2016 Summer Paralympics
Medalists at the World Para Swimming Championships
Medalists at the World Para Swimming European Championships
People from Nacka Municipality
KTH Royal Institute of Technology alumni
Sportspeople from Stockholm County
21st-century Swedish women
Swedish people with disabilities